The Never Never is the name of a vast, remote area of the Australian Outback, as described in Barcroft Boake's poem "Where the Dead Men Lie":
Out on the wastes of the Never Never -
That's where the dead men lie!
There where the heat-waves dance forever -
That's where the dead men lie!

One reference earlier than Barcroft Boake's is The Never Never Land: a Ride in North Queensland (1884) by Archibald William Stirling so it is probable the term was in general use in at least the second half of the nineteenth century.

Life in the Never Never of the Northern Territory was described by Jeannie Gunn in two books including the classic Australian novel We of the Never Never.

Australian author Rosa Praed had published in 1915 the novel Lady Bridget in the Never-Never Land. 

The term was also used several times throughout the 2008 Baz Luhrmann film Australia.

See also
 Outback Terminology

References

Plains of Australia
Australian outback